Mycoplasma capricolum is a species of Mycoplasma bacteria. It is primarily a pathogen of goats, but has also been found in sheep and cows.  The species requires external sources of cholesterol to grow or survive (which usually comes in the form of a natural fatty acid auxotroph), but the uptaken fatty acid is not used as a substrate for energy production but rather for phospholipid synthesis instead.

It causes a disease in goats called contagious caprine pleuropneumonia (CCPP).

References

Further reading

External links
Mycoplasma capricolum at MicrobeWiki
Type strain of Mycoplasma capricolum at BacDive -  the Bacterial Diversity Metadatabase

Goats
capricolum